The Copa Libertadores 1975 was an association football competition contested between the top clubs of the CONMEBOL federation. Independiente won the competition defeating Unión Española 2–0 in a play off after the original two legs finished 2–2 on points.

Group stage

Group 1

Group 2

Group 3

Group 4

Group 5

Semi-finals

Group 1

Group 2

Finals

Extra match

Champion

External links
 Tournament on RSSSF

1
Copa Libertadores seasons